This is a list of the laws of murder by country. The legal definition of murder varies by country: the laws of different countries deal differently with matters such as mens rea (how the intention on the part of the alleged murderer must be proved for the offence to amount to murder) and sentencing.

Australia
Brazil
Canada
China
Cuba
Denmark
England and Wales
Finland
France
Germany
Georgia
Hong Kong
India
Israel
Italy
Netherlands
Northern Ireland
Norway
Peru
Portugal
Romania
Russia
South Africa
Sweden
Switzerland
United States

Murder law by country